Earle Edwards (November 10, 1908 – February 25, 1997) was an American football player and coach. He served as the head football coach at North Carolina State University from 1954 to 1970, compiling a record of 77–88–8. Edwards is the longest tenured coach in NC State Wolfpack football history and holds the program records for games coached, wins, and losses. His teams won five Atlantic Coast Conference (ACC) titles and made two Liberty Bowl appearances. Four times he was named the ACC Coach of the Year.

A native of Greensburg, Pennsylvania, Edwards attended Pennsylvania State University, where he lettered in football and later served as an assistant coach. He died on February 25, 1997, in Raleigh, North Carolina.

Head coaching record

College

References

1908 births
1997 deaths
Michigan State Spartans football coaches
NC State Wolfpack football coaches
Penn State Nittany Lions football coaches
Penn State Nittany Lions football players
High school football coaches in Pennsylvania
People from Greensburg, Pennsylvania
Coaches of American football from Pennsylvania
Players of American football from Pennsylvania